Dejan Živković (Serbian Cyrillic: Дејан Живковић; born 19 August 1979) is a former Serbian professional footballer who played as a striker.

He is best remembered for scoring an extra time goal for Partizan against Sporting Clube de Portugal in the 2002–03 UEFA Cup first round.

Career
Živković started playing football at Partizan at the age of 8. In 1998, he signed a six-year contract for the club. After several years of playing on loans with Teleoptik and Zvezdara, scoring 12 league goals with the latter in the 2001–02 season, Živković returned to Partizan for the 2002–03 season. In the 2003–04 season, he played with Sartid Smederevo, scoring six league goals in 19 appearances. In the following next years, Živković also played with OFK Beograd and Voždovac in the national top flight, before playing in the lower leagues with several clubs.

In 2009, Živković traveled to Australia for a trial with A-League club Central Coast Mariners. However, he signed with the Serbian-backed club Bonnyrigg White Eagles, playing in the NSW Premier League.

In 2012, Živković signed to play with Popinci in the Vojvodina lower league.

Statistics

References

1979 births
Living people
Association football forwards
Bonnyrigg White Eagles FC players
Expatriate footballers in Sweden
Expatriate soccer players in Australia
FK Hajduk Beograd players
FK Partizan players
FK Radnički 1923 players
FK Sevojno players
FK Smederevo players
FK Teleoptik players
FK Voždovac players
FK Zvezdara players
OFK Beograd players
Serbian expatriate footballers
Serbian footballers
Serbian SuperLiga players